A magic hexagram of order 2 is an arrangement of numbers in a hexagram with triangular cells with 2 cells on each edge, in such a way that the numbers in each row, in all three directions, sum to the same magic constant M.

Magic star hexagram 

Magic star hexagram or 6-pointed magic star is a star polygon with Schläfli symbol {6/2} in which numbers are placed at each of the six vertices and six intersections, such that the four numbers on each line sum to the same magic constant.

Magic star hexagram with triangular cell 

There are two solutions of magic star hexagram with 12 triangular cells.

Magic star hexagram with more than 12 vertices 

Harold Reiter and David Ritchie calculated the solution of magic hexagrams with 19 vertices.

See also
Magic square
Magic hexagon

References

External links
 
 The Magic Hexagram
 A Complete Solution to the Magic Hexagram Problem

Magic shapes
Star symbols